Prolactin (PRL), also known as lactotropin, is a protein best known for its role in enabling mammals to produce milk. It is influential in over 300 separate processes in various vertebrates, including humans. Prolactin is secreted from the pituitary gland in response to eating, mating, estrogen treatment, ovulation and nursing.  It is secreted heavily in pulses in between these events. Prolactin plays an essential role in metabolism, regulation of the immune system and pancreatic development.

Discovered in non-human animals around 1930 by Oscar Riddle and confirmed in humans in 1970 by Henry Friesen, prolactin is a peptide hormone,  encoded by the PRL gene.

In mammals, prolactin is associated with milk production; in fish it is thought to be related to the control of water and salt balance. Prolactin also acts in a cytokine-like manner and as an important regulator of the immune system. It has important cell cycle-related functions as a growth-, differentiating- and anti-apoptotic factor. As a growth factor, binding to cytokine-like receptors, it influences hematopoiesis and angiogenesis and is involved in the regulation of blood clotting through several pathways. The hormone acts in endocrine, autocrine, and paracrine manners through the prolactin receptor and numerous cytokine receptors.

Pituitary prolactin secretion is regulated by endocrine neurons in the hypothalamus. The most important of these are the neurosecretory tuberoinfundibulum (TIDA) neurons of the arcuate nucleus that secrete dopamine (a.k.a. Prolactin Inhibitory Hormone) to act on the D2 receptors of lactotrophs, causing inhibition of prolactin secretion. Thyrotropin-releasing hormone has a stimulatory effect on prolactin release, although prolactin is the only anterior pituitary hormone whose principal control is inhibitory.

Several variants and forms are known per species. Many fish have variants prolactin A and prolactin B. Most vertebrates, including humans, also have the closely related somatolactin. In humans, three smaller (4, 16, and 23 kDa) and several larger (so-called big and big-big) variants exist.

Function

In humans 
Prolactin has a wide variety of effects. It stimulates the mammary glands to produce milk (lactation): increased serum concentrations of prolactin during pregnancy cause enlargement of the mammary glands and prepare for milk production, which normally starts when levels of progesterone fall by the end of pregnancy and a suckling stimulus is present. Prolactin plays an important role in maternal behavior.

It has been shown in rats and sheep that prolactin affects lipid synthesis differentially in mammary and adipose cells. Prolactin deficiency induced by bromocriptine increased lipogenesis and insulin responsiveness in adipocytes while decreasing them in the mammary gland.

In general, dopamine inhibits prolactin but this process has feedback mechanisms.

Elevated levels of prolactin decrease the levels of sex hormones—estrogen in women and testosterone in men. The effects of mildly elevated levels of prolactin are much more variable, in women, substantially increasing or decreasing estrogen levels.

Prolactin is sometimes classified as a gonadotropin although in humans it has only a weak luteotropic effect while the effect of suppressing classical gonadotropic hormones is more important. Prolactin within the normal reference ranges can act as a weak gonadotropin, but at the same time suppresses gonadotropin-releasing hormone secretion. The exact mechanism by which it inhibits gonadotropin-releasing hormone is poorly understood. Although expression of prolactin receptors have been demonstrated in rat hypothalamus, the same has not been observed in gonadotropin-releasing hormone neurons.  Physiologic levels of prolactin in males enhance luteinizing hormone-receptors in Leydig cells, resulting in testosterone secretion, which leads to spermatogenesis.

Prolactin also stimulates proliferation of oligodendrocyte precursor cells. These cells differentiate into oligodendrocytes, the cells responsible for the formation of myelin coatings on axons in the central nervous system.

Other actions include contributing to pulmonary surfactant synthesis of the fetal lungs at the end of the pregnancy and immune tolerance of the fetus by the maternal organism during pregnancy. Prolactin promotes neurogenesis in maternal and fetal brains.

In music psychology, it is conjectured that prolactin may play a role in the pleasurable perception of sad music, as the levels of the hormone increase when a person feels sad, producing a consoling psychological effect.

In other vertebrates 

The primary function of prolactin in fish is osmoregulation, i.e., controlling the movement of water and salts between the tissues of the fish and the surrounding water. Like mammals, however, prolactin in fish also has reproductive functions, including promoting sexual maturation and inducing breeding cycles, as well as brooding and parental care. In the South American discus, prolactin may also regulate the production of a skin secretion that provides food for larval fry. An increase in brooding behaviour caused by prolactin has been reported in hens.

Prolactin and its receptor are expressed in the skin, specifically in the hair follicles, where they regulate hair growth and moulting in an autocrine fashion. Elevated levels of prolactin can inhibit hair growth, and knock-out mutations in the prolactin gene cause increased hair length in cattle and mice. Conversely, mutations in the prolactin receptor can cause reduced hair growth, resulting in the "slick" phenotype in cattle. Additionally, prolactin delays hair regrowth in mice.

Analogous to its effects on hair growth and shedding in mammals, prolactin in birds controls the moulting of feathers, as well as the age at onset of feathering in both turkeys and chickens.

In rodents, pseudopregnancy can occur when a female is mated with a sterile male. This mating can cause bi-daily surges of prolactin which would normally occur in rodent pregnancy. Prolactin surges initiate the secretion of progesterone which maintains pregnancy and hence can initiate pseudopregnancy. The false maintenance of pregnancy exhibits the outward physical symptoms of pregnancy, in the absence of a foetus.

Regulation 

In humans, prolactin is produced at least in the anterior pituitary, decidua, myometrium, breast, lymphocytes, leukocytes and prostate.

Pituitary prolactin is controlled by the Pit-1 transcription factor that binds to the prolactin gene at several sites. Ultimately dopamine, extrapituitary prolactin is controlled by a superdistal promoter and apparently unaffected by dopamine. The thyrotropin-releasing hormone and the vasoactive intestinal peptide stimulate the secretion of prolactin in experimental settings, however their physiological influence is unclear. The main stimulus for prolactin secretion is suckling, the effect of which is neuronally mediated. A key regulator of prolactin production is estrogens that enhance growth of prolactin-producing cells and stimulate prolactin production directly, as well as suppressing dopamine.

In decidual cells and in lymphocytes the distal promoter and thus prolactin expression is stimulated by cAMP. Responsivness to cAMP is mediated by an imperfect cAMP–responsive element and two CAAT/enhancer binding proteins (C/EBP). Progesterone upregulates prolactin synthesis in the endometrium and decreases it in myometrium and breast glandular tissue. Breast and other tissues may express the Pit-1 promoter in addition to the distal promoter.
 
Extrapituitary production of prolactin is thought to be special to humans and primates and may serve mostly tissue-specific paracrine and autocrine purposes. It has been hypothesized that in vertebrates such as mice a similar tissue-specific effect is achieved by a large family of prolactin-like proteins controlled by at least 26 paralogous PRL genes not present in primates.

Vasoactive intestinal peptide and peptide histidine isoleucine help to regulate prolactin secretion in humans, but the functions of these hormones in birds can be quite different.

Prolactin follows diurnal and ovulatory cycles. Prolactin levels peak during REM sleep and in the early morning. Many mammals experience a seasonal cycle.

During pregnancy, high circulating concentrations of estrogen and progesterone increase prolactin levels by 10- to 20-fold. Estrogen and progesterone inhibit the stimulatory effects of prolactin on milk production. The abrupt drop of estrogen and progesterone levels following delivery allow prolactin—which temporarily remains high—to induce lactation.

Sucking on the nipple offsets the fall in prolactin as the internal stimulus for them is removed. The sucking activates mechanoreceptors in and around the nipple. These signals are carried by nerve fibers through the spinal cord to the hypothalamus, where changes in the electrical activity of neurons that regulate the pituitary gland increase prolactin secretion. The suckling stimulus also triggers the release of oxytocin from the posterior pituitary gland, which triggers milk let-down: Prolactin controls milk production (lactogenesis) but not the milk-ejection reflex; the rise in prolactin fills the breast with milk in preparation for the next feed.

In usual circumstances, in the absence of galactorrhea, lactation ceases within one or two weeks following the end of breastfeeding.

Levels can rise after exercise, high-protein meals, minor surgical procedures, following epileptic seizures or due to physical or emotional stress. In a study on female volunteers under hypnosis, prolactin surges resulted from the evocation, with rage, of humiliating experiences, but not from the fantasy of nursing.

Hypersecretion is more common than hyposecretion. Hyperprolactinemia is the most frequent abnormality of the anterior pituitary tumors, termed prolactinomas. Prolactinomas may disrupt the hypothalamic-pituitary-gonadal axis as prolactin tends to suppress the secretion of gonadotropin-releasing hormone from the hypothalamus and in turn decreases the secretion of follicle-stimulating hormone and luteinizing hormone from the anterior pituitary, therefore disrupting the ovulatory cycle. Such hormonal changes may manifest as amenorrhea and infertility in females as well as erectile dysfunction in males. Inappropriate lactation (galactorrhoea) is another important clinical sign of prolactinomas.

Structure and isoforms 

The structure of prolactin is similar to that of growth hormone and placental lactogen. The molecule is folded due to the activity of three disulfide bonds. Significant heterogeneity of the molecule has been described, thus bioassays and immunoassays can give different results due to differing glycosylation, phosphorylation and sulfation, as well as degradation. The non-glycosylated form of prolactin is the dominant form that is secreted by the pituitary gland.

The three different sizes of prolactin are:
Little prolactin—the predominant form. It has a molecular weight of approximately 23-kDa. It is a single-chain polypeptide of 199 amino acids and is apparently the result of removal of some amino acids.
Big prolactin—approximately 48 kDa. It may be the product of interaction of several prolactin molecules. It appears to have little, if any, biological activity.
Big big prolactin—approximately 150 kDa. It appears to have a low biological activity.
The levels of larger ones are somewhat higher during the early postpartum period.

Prolactin receptor 

Prolactin receptors are present in the mammillary glands, ovaries, pituitary glands, heart, lung, thymus, spleen, liver, pancreas, kidney, adrenal gland, uterus, skeletal muscle, skin and areas of the central nervous system. When prolactin binds to the receptor, it causes it to dimerize with another prolactin receptor. This results in the activation of Janus kinase 2, a tyrosine kinase that initiates the JAK-STAT pathway. Activation also results in the activation of mitogen-activated protein kinases and Src kinase.

Human prolactin receptors are insensitive to mouse prolactin.

Diagnostic use 
Prolactin levels may be checked as part of a sex hormone workup, as elevated prolactin secretion can suppress the secretion of follicle stimulating hormone and gonadotropin-releasing hormone, leading to hypogonadism and sometimes causing erectile dysfunction.

Prolactin levels may be of some use in distinguishing epileptic seizures from psychogenic non-epileptic seizures. The serum prolactin level usually rises following an epileptic seizure.

Units and unit conversions 

The serum concentration of prolactin can be given in mass concentration (µg/L or ng/mL), molar concentration (nmol/L or pmol/L), or international units (typically mIU/L). The current IU is calibrated against the third International Standard for Prolactin, IS 84/500. Reference ampoules of IS 84/500 contain 2.5 µg of lyophilized human prolactin and have been assigned an activity of .053 International Units. Measurements that are calibrated against the current international standard can be converted into mass units using this ratio of grams to IUs; prolactin concentrations expressed in mIU/L can be converted to µg/L by dividing by 21.2. Previous standards use other ratios.

The first International Reference Preparation (or IRP) of human Prolactin for Immunoassay was established in 1978 (75/504 1st IRP for human prolactin) at a time when purified human prolactin was in short supply. Previous standards relied on prolactin from animal sources. Purified human prolactin was scarce, heterogeneous, unstable, and difficult to characterize. A preparation labeled 81/541 was distributed by the WHO Expert Committee on Biological Standardization without official status and given the assigned value of 50 mIU/ampoule based on an earlier collaborative study. It was determined that this preparation behaved anomalously in certain immunoassays and was not suitable as an IS.

Three different human pituitary extracts containing prolactin were subsequently obtained as candidates for an IS. These were distributed into ampoules coded 83/562, 83/573, and 84/500. Collaborative studies involving 20 different laboratories found little difference between these three preparations. 83/562 appeared to be the most stable. This preparation was largely free of dimers and polymers of prolactin. On the basis of these investigations, 83/562 was established as the Second IS for human prolactin. Once stocks of these ampoules were depleted, 84/500 was established as the Third IS for human prolactin.

Reference ranges 

General guidelines for diagnosing prolactin excess (hyperprolactinemia) define the upper threshold of normal prolactin at 25 µg/L for women and 20 µg/L for men. Similarly, guidelines for diagnosing prolactin deficiency (hypoprolactinemia) are defined as prolactin levels below 3 µg/L in women and 5 µg/L in men. However, different assays and methods for measuring prolactin are employed by different laboratories and as such the serum reference range for prolactin is often determined by the laboratory performing the measurement. Furthermore, prolactin levels vary according to factors as age, sex, menstrual cycle stage and pregnancy. The circumstances surrounding a given prolactin measurement (assay, patient condition, etc.) must therefore be considered before the measurement can be accurately interpreted.

The following chart illustrates the variations seen in normal prolactin measurements across different populations. Prolactin values were obtained from specific control groups of varying sizes using the IMMULITE assay.

Inter-method variability 

The following table illustrates variability in reference ranges of serum prolactin between some commonly used assay methods (as of 2008), using a control group of healthy health care professionals (53 males, age 20–64 years, median 28 years; 97 females, age 19–59 years, median 29 years) in Essex, England:

An example of the use of the above table is, if using the Centaur assay to estimate prolactin values in µg/L for females, the mean is 7.92 µg/L and the reference range is 3.35–16.4 µg/L.

Conditions

Elevated levels 
Hyperprolactinaemia, or excess serum prolactin, is associated with hypoestrogenism, anovulatory infertility, oligomenorrhoea, amenorrhoea, unexpected lactation and loss of libido in women and erectile dysfunction and loss of libido in men.

Physiological
 Coitus
 Exercise
 Lactation
 Pregnancy
 Sleep
 Stress
 Depression

Pharmacological
 Anesthetics
 Anticonvulsant
 Antihistamines (H2)
 Antihypertensives
 Cholinergic agonist
 Drug-induced hypersecretion
 Catecholamine depletor
 Dopamine receptor blockers
 Dopamine synthesis inhibitor
 Estrogens
 Oral contraceptives
 Oral contraceptive withdrawal
 Antipsychotics
 Neuropeptides
 Opioids and opioid receptor antagonists

Pathological
 Hypothalamic-pituitary stalk damage
 Granulomas
 Infiltrations
 Radiation
 Rathke's cyst
 Trauma
 Pituitary stalk resection
 Suprasellar surgery
 Tumors
 Craniopharyngioma
 Germinoma
 Hypothalamic metastases
 Meningioma
 Suprasellar pituitary mass extension
 Surgery

 
 Pituitary
 Acromegaly
 Idiopathic
 Lymphocytic hypophysitis or parasellar mass
 Macroadenoma (compressive)
 Macroprolactinemia
 Plurihumoral adenoma
 Prolactinoma
 Systemic disorders
 Chest-neurologic chest wall trauma
 Herpes Zoster
 Chronic renal failure
 Cirrhosis
 Cranial radiation
 Epileptic seizures
 Polycystic ovarian disease
 Pseudocyesis
 Chronic low levels of thyroid hormone

Decreased levels 

Hypoprolactinemia, or serum prolactin deficiency, is associated with ovarian dysfunction in women, and arteriogenic erectile dysfunction, premature ejaculation, oligozoospermia, asthenospermia, hypofunction of seminal vesicles and hypoandrogenism in men. In one study, normal sperm characteristics were restored when prolactin levels were raised to normal values in hypoprolactinemic men.

Hypoprolactinemia can result from hypopituitarism, excessive dopaminergic action in the tuberoinfundibular pathway and ingestion of D2 receptor agonists such as bromocriptine.

In medicine
Prolactin is available commercially for use in other animals, but not in humans. It is used to stimulate lactation in animals. The biological half-life of prolactin in humans is around 15–20 minutes. The D2 receptor is involved in the regulation of prolactin secretion, and agonists of the receptor such as bromocriptine and cabergoline decrease prolactin levels while antagonists of the receptor such as domperidone, metoclopramide, haloperidol, risperidone, and sulpiride increase prolactin levels. D2 receptor antagonists like domperidone, metoclopramide, and sulpiride are used as galactogogues to increase prolactin secretion in the pituitary gland and induce lactation in humans.

See also
 Breast-feeding
 Breastfeeding and fertility
 Epileptic seizure
 Hyperprolactinaemia
 Hypothalamic–pituitary–prolactin axis
 Male lactation
 Prolactin modulator
 Prolactin receptor
 Prolactin-releasing hormone
 Prolactinoma
 Weaning

References

External links
 
 

Anterior pituitary hormones
Breastfeeding
Galactagogues
Hormones of the hypothalamic-pituitary-prolactin axis
Hormones of the pregnant female
Human hormones
Human female endocrine system
Peptide hormones